Richard William Bryant Atkinson,  (born 17 December 1958) is a British Anglican bishop. He was the Archdeacon of Leicester between 2002 and 2012, and is the current suffragan Bishop of Bedford in the Diocese of St Albans, serving the churches of the Bedford Archdeaconry.

He succeeded Richard Inwood who retired to the Diocese of Derby.

Atkinson was consecrated by Rowan Williams, Archbishop of Canterbury, in St Paul's Cathedral on Ascension Day 2012. A Service of Welcome into the Diocese took place at St Paul's Church, Bedford on 19 May 2012 at which Atkinson also preached his first sermon as a bishop.

Atkinson was educated at St Paul's School, London, Magdalene College, Cambridge and Ripon College Cuddesdon. He was ordained in 1985 and was a curate in Abingdon. After this he held incumbencies in Sheffield and Rotherham.

Upon the announcement of his appointment in March 2012, Atkinson said: “I am looking forward enormously to getting to know the diversity and depth of the communities of Bedfordshire and Luton. I am passionate about the Church’s capacity to change all lives and communities for the better. I am enthusiastic to enable and equip the Church to reach out in love and service to our contemporary world, and committed to speaking up for the marginalised, poor and vulnerable. I pay tribute to the work being done all over the Diocese of St Albans, but especially in Bedfordshire and Luton.”

The bishop participated in the Congress of Leaders of World and Traditional Religions in the capital of Kazakhstan in 2013. The forum is widely recognized by the international community for its efforts in promoting religious tolerance and peace. Richard has three children; Charlotte, Naomi and William.

Styles
The Reverend Richard Atkinson (–2002)
The Venerable Richard Atkinson (2002–2012)
The Right Reverend Richard Atkinson (2012–present)

References

1958 births
People educated at St Paul's School, London
Alumni of Magdalene College, Cambridge
Alumni of Ripon College Cuddesdon
Archdeacons of Leicester
Officers of the Order of the British Empire
Bishops of Bedford
Living people